Vitaly Novik (born 9 November 1994) is a Belarusian professional footballer who plays for Neman-Belcard Grodno.

External links
 
 
 Profile at Gomel website

1994 births
Living people
Belarusian footballers
Association football defenders
FC Gomel players
FC Sputnik Rechitsa players